Nuevo León (literally: New Lion) is a state in the northeast region of Mexico. The state was named after the New Kingdom of León, an administrative territory from the Viceroyalty of New Spain, itself was named after the historic Spanish Kingdom of León. With a total land area of 64,555 square kilometers (24,771 square miles), Nuevo León is the 13th largest federal entity in Mexico. The state is bordered by Tamaulipas to the east, Coahuila to the west, and both Zacatecas and San Luis Potosi to the south. To the north, it shares an extremely narrow international border with the U.S. state of Texas. The Laredo-Colombia Solidarity International Bridge is the only vehicular bridge that connects the United States with the state of Nuevo León. It crosses over the Rio Grande (Rio Bravo) between the city of Colombia, Nuevo León, and Laredo, Texas.

Nuevo Léon is the seventh largest state in terms of population with an estimated population of 5.78 million people in 2020. The state's most populous city is Monterrey with 1.42 million people; the Monterrey metropolitan area is the second largest metropolitan area in Mexico with an estimated population of 5.3 million people in 2020. Monterrey is known for being an important industrial, intellectual and financial city in Mexico.

Nuevo León's geography is known for englobing three of the most important physiographic provinces of the northeast region. The south end of the Great Plains is considered to start in the northernmost regions of Nuevo León. The region is characterized by the soft hills that dominates the lands neighboring the banks of the Rio Grande. The south and west of the state consists of the Sierra Madre Oriental mountain range, which dominates most of the western scenery. Due to the abrupt shape of the mountains, there are vast valleys in between the mountains. Within these valleys is where the city of Monterrey and its metropolitan area is situated. The Northern Gulf Coastal Plains are located to the east and include low altitude lands; it is classified as an "inclined plain" due to the alluvial land.

History

Nuevo León was founded by conqueror Alberto del Canto, although frequent raids by Chichimecas, the natives of the north, prevented the establishment of almost any permanent settlements. Subsequent to the failure of del Canto to populate the area, Luis Carvajal y de la Cueva, at the head of a group of Portuguese and Spanish settlers who were of Jewish descent, requested permission from the Spanish King to attempt to settle the area which would be called the New Kingdom of León and would fail as well.   It wasn't until 1596 under the leadership of Diego de Montemayor the colony became permanent. Nuevo Leon eventually became (along with the provinces of Coahuila, Nuevo Santander and Texas) one of the Eastern Internal Provinces in Northern New Spain.

The capital of Nuevo León is Monterrey, the second largest city in Mexico with over five million residents. Monterrey is a modern and affluent city, and Nuevo León has long been one of Mexico's most industrialized states.

Geography

Nuevo León has an extreme climate, and there is very little rainfall throughout the year. The Sierra Madre Oriental mountain range affects in an important way the lay of the land forming the Galeana and Doctor Arroyo plateaus, the Iguana, Picachos, Papagayos, and Santa Clara mountain ranges, and the Pilón, Ascensión, and Río Blanco valleys. As for hydrography, the San Juan River supplies the El Cuchillo dam, which provides water for Monterrey and the metropolitan area. There are also the Cerro Prieto, La Boca, Vaquerías, Nogalitos, and Agualeguas dams. Laguna de Labradores is a major lake in Nuevo León, and Pozo del Gavilán is a natural well. Both are located in the Galeana municipality. The flora of the region includes brush and pastures in the low regions, and pine and oak trees in the mountains. The fauna includes black bears, mountain lions, javelinas, prairie dogs, foxes, coyotes, and white-tailed deer, along with smaller species.

Climate
Nuevo León has many biomes, which is why it has different climates. Some areas in the mountains are very cold in winter and temperate in summer. In the northern part of the state the climate is arid as a result of the proximity to the Chihuahuan desert. Extreme high temperatures of 47 °C or more occur on the desert areas while winters are short and mild. In Monterrey the climate is hot semi-arid with extreme hot summers and mild winters. There is very little rainfall throughout the year, usually about 500 mm or less. February 2021 North American ice storm sent temperatures in Monterrey below zero celsius.

Flora and fauna

Demography

Nuevo's León's demographics are overwhelmingly dominated by the metropolitan area of Monterrey. As of 2020, Nuevo León's population was about 5.784 million, and of this over 90% of that population resides within the Monterrey Metropolitan area, making it the second largest metropolitan area in the country. Life expectancy in the state is higher than average for Mexico, being 73 years for men and 79 years for women. People with disabilities are found clustered in the central areas of Monterrey.

Ninety-four percent of the total population occupies urban areas, one million of which are homeowners, and 98% have all utilities (running water, sewer systems and electric power). The remaining 2% are mostly the small indigenous population which is isolated and lives in the mountainous regions.

The majority of the population identifies as being Roman Catholic, similar to the rest of Mexico.

Education

The high quality of life that prevails across the state is reflected on statistical rates such as education, as the entity reports an almost perfect record for finished secondary education, and 13 in 100 inhabitants earn a professional degree. In the same line, illiteracy rates for the state are within the lowest in the nation at 2.8%, just behind the Distrito Federal which still leads the country in this regard.

Institutions of higher education include:

Instituto Tecnológico y de Estudios Superiores de Monterrey (ITESM)
Escuela de Graduados en Administración y Dirección de Empresas (EGADE)
Escuela de Graduados en Administración Pública (EGAP)
Universidad Autónoma de Nuevo León (UANL)
Centro de Estudios Universitarios (CEU)
Universidad Regiomontana (U-ERRE)
Universidad Metropolitana de Monterrey(UMM)
Universidad de Monterrey (UDEM)
Centro de Estudios Superiores de Diseño de Monterrey (CEDIM)
Universidad de Montemorelos (UM)
Escuela Superior de Música y Danza de Monterrey (La Superior)
Instituto Panamericano de Alta Dirección de Empresa (IPADE)

Economy
Highly industrialized, with key industries including computing, electronic and transport equipment, food products, basic metallic industries, and oil derivatives and coal, Nuevo León possesses a standard of living similar to that of countries such as Croatia, Slovakia or Poland. In 2007, the per capita GDP of the state was similar to that of the Asian Tiger of South Korea and even higher than that of some European Union states such as Slovakia and Hungary. At about $27,000, it was the highest GDP per capita (PPP) of any Mexican state (not counting the Federal District, which also has a very high per capita), and was therefore higher than the Mexican national average (2013 GDP per capita (PPP) national average was $15,700).

One of its municipalities, San Pedro Garza García, is among the richest in the country in terms of per capita income. It is also home of powerful conglomerates, such as Cemex (one of the largest construction materials firms in the world), Bimbo (bakery and pastry), Maseca (food and grains), Banorte (the only high-street bank in Mexico wholly owned by Mexicans), ALFA (Sigma, Alestra, Nemak, Alpek and Hylsa (recently bought by Ternium), i-service (HelpDesk), Vitro SA (glass), FEMSA (Coca-Cola in Latin America), and Cervecería Cuauhtémoc Moctezuma (brewers of Sol, Tecate, XX, Bohemia, Indio and Nochebuena).

Nuevo León also boasts a rich agricultural core, called the "orange belt", which comprises the municipalities of Allende, Montemorelos, Hualahuises, General Terán and Linares. Small but productive investments have been transforming traditional harvests (mainly based on orange and cereals) into agroindustrial developments that are producing increasing revenues for the local economy.

In contrast with the relative wealth of industrial Nuevo León and the orange belt, the Southern part of the state (municipalities of Galeana, Aramberri, Zaragoza, Doctor Arroyo and Mier y Noriega) remains rural and less productive. Most of The South of the state is at the mercy of a very dry weather that represents a major hurdle for agriculture and livestock.

As of 2010, Nuevo León's economy represents 11.4% of Mexico's total gross domestic product or US$165 billion. Nuevo León's economy has a strong focus on export oriented manufacturing (i.e. maquiladora / INMEX). As of 2005, 431,551 people are employed in the manufacturing sector.   Foreign direct investment in Nuevo León was 1,213.1 million USD for 2005.
In recent years, the state government has been making efforts in attracting significant investments in aeronautics, biotechnology, mechatronics, information and communication technologies fields with the creation of the Research and Technology Innovation Park PIIT (Parque de Investigación e Innovación Tecnológica [es]), a technology park oriented in the development, innovation and research of sciences. The project is one of the key strategies within the Monterrey, City of Knowledge program. The park is located in the municipality of Apodaca, part of Greater Monterrey at the 10 km of the highway to Monterrey's International Airport. It consists of a total surface area of 70 Ha (172 acres), half of it already committed to R&D centers. The other 35 Ha (86 acres) are available for research and development centers, and for businesses that meet the Park's objectives.

Government

Official name
  Estado Libre y Soberano de Nuevo León (Free and Sovereign State of Nuevo León).
Official motto
  Latin: Semper Ascendens (Always Ascending).
Type of government
 Republican and representative according to 30th article of the local constitution.
Executive
  In the June 6, 2021 gubernatorial election, Citizens' Movement (Movimiento Ciudadano or MC) – founded as a "national political grouping" in 1997 that describes itself as social-democratic – gained control of the state from Enrique Peña Nieto's Institutional Revolutionary Party (PRI). The new governor, Samuel García Sepúlveda of the MC, was sworn in on 4 October 2021 for a period of six years.
Cabinet
  Chosen directly by the Governor except for the General Comptroller and the State General Attorney, which are elected by Congress from a list of names provided by the Governor.
Legislative
  The State has a unicameral chamber. The LXXVI Congress of Nuevo León is composed of 42 deputies, 26 of them chosen by first-past-the-post electoral districts and 16 of them by proportional representation on a party-list basis. The parties represented are the National Action Party with 14 deputies (PAN), the PRI with 13 deputies, the MC with 11 deputies, MORENA with 2 deputies, the Ecologist Green Party of Mexico with 1 deputy (PVEM), and 1 independent deputy.
Judiciary
  Judicial power rests in the Superior Court of Justice of Nuevo León, led by Minister José Arturo Salinas Garza.
Political parties
  Official recognition is given by the State Electoral Commission to those parties getting more than 1.5% of the votes in the last election (Art.40 of the State Electoral Law), which are the ones represented in Congress.

 Current Direction of Politics
 There has been a shift in the politics of Nuevo Leon. The shift has been from a hegemonic system into a two party system, and it is currently evolving from a two party system into a multiparty system.

Municipalities 
Nuevo León is divided into 51 municipalities (municipios). See municipalities of Nuevo León.

Metropolitan Area of Monterrey 
The metropolitan area

Media
Newspapers and news websites of Nuevo León include: ABC Noticias, El Gráfico de Nuevo León, El Norte, El Porvenir, La Última Palabra, Milenio, Publimetro edición Monterrey, Reporte Índigo, Distrito Regio, Solo Ofertas, El Horizonte, Regio.com, Red Crucero, Noticias Nuevo León.

Twinning and covenants 
The state has agreements with other states, provinces, regions and autonomous communities.

  Quebec
  Texas
  Catalonia
  Lombardy, Italy
  State of Mexico, Mexico
  Jalisco, Mexico

See also

Fiestas of Nuevo León
History of Nuevo León
Sierra de Picachos

Sources 
Human Development Report for Mexico 2002
Historia de Nuevo León by Israel Cavazos 
Enciclopedia de los Municipios de México 
Comisión Estatal Electoral de Nuevo León 
Ley Estatal Electoral de Nuevo León, 1996

References

External links

Nuevo León State Government 

 
States of Mexico
Mexican Plateau states
States and territories established in 1824
1824 establishments in Mexico